Cecilia Malan (born 16 April 1983, in Rio de Janeiro), is a Brazilian broadcast journalist. She is the daughter of Brazilian economist and former Minister of Finance, Pedro Malan. She has been the London-based correspondent for Rede Globo since 2011.

Career
Cecilia lived in New York, Washington D.C., Brasilia and Paris before majoring in journalism at Pontifícia Universidade Católica do Rio de Janeiro. She started her career at Globo TV in 2005, as an intern on the morning news show, Bom Dia Brasil. At the foreign news desk, as an international editor, she helped cover the deaths of Pope John Paul II and Michael Jackson, the devastation of Hurricane Katrina, Barack Obama's historical election, and the global crisis of 2008, among other stories. 

In 2011, Cecilia transferred to the London bureau. She has been producing and reporting on breaking news, business, political, lifestyle, cultural and entertainment stories since. 

Cecilia reported on all the major terror attacks of the past decade in the UK (murders of Fusilier Lee Rigby and MP Jo Cox, Westminster Bridge attack, Manchester Arena bombing, London Bridge nightmare). Beyond London, Cecilia also covered the attacks on the French satirical magazine Charlie Hebdo in January 2015. Hours into her reporting on the dramatic events unfolding in Paris, French special forces stormed the kosher market where hostages were being held. Less than 300 meters away from the scene, she was surprised by the sound of explosions and gunshots. During her live broadcast, she readily admitted to never having heard the sound of gunfire before. The episode instantly became a trending topic on Twitter. Most viewers praised her "authentic spontaneity" and appreciated the fact that "journalists are not robots", others considered her to be "too nervous".

Cecilia has also conducted high-profile interviews with some of the biggest names in the public eye: David Beckham, Brad Pitt, the boys from One Direction, English singer and songwriter Adele, celebrity chef Jamie Oliver, author E.L. James, ex-Guantanamo Bay detainee Moazzam Begg and British Prime Minister David Cameron.

The good, the bad and the ugly of Brexit dominated her reporting for many years in London. As did Covid-19. Cecilia spent more than a year doing live broadcasts from home during the pandemic.

Cecilia was married from 2013 to 2020. And has a daughter, Olimpia, born in July 2019.

References

1983 births
Living people
Writers from Rio de Janeiro (city)
Brazilian television journalists
Television reporters and correspondents
Pontifical Catholic University of Rio de Janeiro alumni